Cyanosesia is a genus of moths in the family Sesiidae.

Species
Cyanosesia borneensis  Kallies, 2003
Cyanosesia cyanolampra (Diakonoff, [1968])
Cyanosesia cyanosa  Kallies & Arita, 2004
Cyanosesia formosana  Arita & Gorbunov, 2002
Cyanosesia hypochalcia (Hampson, 1919)
Cyanosesia javana Gorbunov & Kallies, 1998
Cyanosesia litseavora  Kallies & Arita, 2004
Cyanosesia meyi  Kallies & Arita, 1998
Cyanosesia pelocroca (Diakonoff, [1968])
Cyanosesia philippina  Gorbunov & Kallies, 1998
Cyanosesia tonkinensis  Gorbunov & Arita, 1995
Cyanosesia treadawayi  Kallies & Arita, 1998
Cyanosesia vietnamica  Gorbunov & Arita, 1995

References

Sesiidae